is a town located in Takaoka District, Kōchi Prefecture, Japan.

Geography
Sakawa is located in a basin along the Yanase River, a tributary of the Niyodo River, in the midwestern part of Kochi Prefecture on the island of Shikoku. The landscape is hilly and the roads and footpaths are winding and narrow. The town is 28 km west of Kōchi City. The tallest mountain in Sakawa is Mt. Kokuzo, with an elevation of 675 meters. Many rivers also run through the town, which are tributaries of the Niyodo River.

Neighbouring municipalities 
Kōchi Prefecture
 Tosa
  Ino
 Susaki
  Hidaka
 Tsuno

Climate
Sakawa has a Humid subtropical climate (Köppen Cfa) characterized by warm summers and cool winters with light snowfall.  The average annual temperature in Sakawa is 15.3 °C. The average annual rainfall is 2688 mm with September as the wettest month. The temperatures are highest on average in January, at around 25.6 °C, and lowest in January, at around 5.0 °C.Sakawa experiences extreme seasons. Spring and Fall are mild and cool. Summer is very warm and temperatures routinely reach 35 °C with 100% humidity. The coldest months are January and February with temperatures around 10 °C during the day. There are usually one or two light snowfalls in January. The rainy season is from June to August and typhoons are common during this time.

Demographics
Per Japanese census data, the population of Sakawa has been decreasing slowly since the 1980s.

History 
As with all of Kōchi Prefecture, the area of Sakawa was part of ancient Tosa Province. Relics from the Japanese Paleolithic. Since then, Sakawa has been named “Mecca of geology in Japan” because "some of the world’s rarest and most precious fossils have been unearthed" in Sakawa.  through Jomon and Yayoi periods have been found in the town. During the Edo period, the area was part of the holdings of Tosa Domain ruled by the Yamauchi clan from their seat at Kōchi Castle. The village of Sakawa was established with the creation of the modern municipalities system on October 1, 1889. It was promoted to town status on January 10, 1900.

Government
Sakawa has a mayor-council form of government with a directly elected mayor and a unicameral village council of 14 members. Sakawa, together with the municipalities of Hidaka and Ochi, contributes one member to the Kōchi Prefectural Assembly. In terms of national politics, the town is part of Kōchi 2nd district of the lower house of the Diet of Japan.

Economy
Sakawa's economy is centered on agriculture, notably growing rice, Japanese pears, tea leaves, soybeans, strawberries, and many other crops. Sakawa is famous for the production of Tsukasabotan, a type of sake. There is a brewery in town that offers free tours and samples. Traditionally, the town is also home to artisans who produce hand-made earthenware and woven bamboo products.

Education
Sakawa has four public elementary schools and three public middle schools operated by the town government, and one public high school operated by the Kōchi Prefecture Board of Education. There are also one middle school and one high school operated jointly wit neighboring Hidaka Village.

Transportation

Railway
 Shikoku Railway Company - Dosan Line
  -  -  -  -

Highways

Local attractions
Old Seizan Library, the only Western-style wooden structure still standing in Kōchi Prefecture. Although no longer in use as a library (a new building houses all the historical texts), the house remains open as a small museum and historical site.
Fudō-ga-Iwaya Cave, National Historic Site

Notable people from Sakawa  
 Tomitaro Makino, Father of Japanese Botany
 Ono Daisuke, voice actor
 Satoshi Yamaguchi, Japanese football player
 Masako Bandō, Japanese novelist
 Koji Yoshimura, Japanese former football player and older brother of Keiji Yoshimura
 Keiji Yoshimura, Japanese former football player and younger brother of Koji Yoshimura
 Hiroshi Takahashi, Japanese architect

See also 
 Asteroid 19161 Sakawa, named after the town

References

External links 
 
 Sakawa official website 

Towns in Kōchi Prefecture
Sakawa, Kōchi